The Darling 58 is a genetically engineered American chestnut tree. The tree was created by American Chestnut Research & Restoration Program at the State University of New York College of Environmental Science and Forestry, to restore the American chestnut to the forests of North America.  These Darling-58 trees are attacked by chestnut blight, but survive. Native un-modified trees are killed from the ground up by the blight, and only the root system survives. The roots then continue to send up shoots that are once again attacked by the blight and die back before they reach maturity, repeating the cycle. Darling-58 trees survive to reach maturity, produce chestnuts, and multiply to restore the American Chestnut tree to the forests of North America.

Further reading
The USDA Should Let People Plant Blight-Resistant American Chestnut Trees

References

Castanea
Ecological restoration
Genetically modified organisms